Ooia is a genus of flowering plants in the family Araceae, formally described in 2010. It has two known species, both endemic to the island of Borneo.

Ooia grabowskii (Engl.) S.Y.Wong & P.C.Boyce - Borneo  (syn= Rhynchopyle grabowskii Engl., Piptospatha grabowskii (Engl.) Engl.)
Ooia kinabaluensis (Bogner) S.Y.Wong & P.C.Boyce - Sabah, Brunei   (syn= Hottarum kinabaluense Bogner, Piptospatha kinabaluensis (Bogner) Bogner & A.Hay)

References

Aroideae
Araceae genera
Endemic flora of Borneo